Robert Emory Glanville Downey (14 June 1908 — 18 December 1991) was an American historian, specializing in history of Late antiquity, primarily in the early Byzantine East and the era of Justinian.

Biography 
He was born in Baltimore, Maryland in 1908. For many years he was Professor of History and Classical Philology at Indiana University in Bloomington, worked at Princeton University, and in the 1940s was actively involved in archaeological research in Istanbul (excavation of the Church of the Apostles). In 1956 he was awarded the Guggenheim Fellowship. Downey made a most significant contribution to the study of the early Byzantine cities of Antioch and Gaza in Palestine. The problems of the history of the individual cities of Early Byzantium are among the most important in modern Byzantine studies. Apart from archaeological research, we deal here with the economic activities of the inhabitants, social strata and relations between them, municipal self-government, and ethno-confessional relations. One of the most striking cities in this respect is Gaza, Palestine. He died on December 18, 1991 in Sacramento, California.

Works

Books

Selected articles

Translations

References

External links 
 

American Byzantinists
1908 births
1991 deaths
Indiana University Bloomington faculty
Princeton University people
Writers from Baltimore
20th-century American historians